Hajji Pamoq (also Romanized as Ḩājjī Pamoq and Hājī Pamoq; also known as Ḩājīābād, Hajī Pamagh, Hājī Pa yī Mūgh, Ḩājjīābād, and Sarāb-e Ḩājjī Peymūq) is a village in Howmeh-ye Dehgolan Rural District, in the Central District of Dehgolan County, Kurdistan Province, Iran. At the 2006 census, its population was 463, in 109 families. The village is populated by Kurds.

References 

Towns and villages in Dehgolan County
Kurdish settlements in Kurdistan Province